The  2014 Kyoto gubernatorial election was held on 06 April 2014 to elect the next governor of , a prefecture of Japan located in the Kansai region of Honshu island. Governor Keiji Yamada was re-elected for a fourth term, defeating Nozomu Ozaki with 69.04% of the vote.

Candidates 

Keiji Yamada, 60, incumbent (since 2002), former Home Affairs Ministry bureaucrat, former vice governor of the prefecture. He was supported by the LDP, Komeito party, as well as the opposition DPJ and SDP.
Nozomu Ozaki, of the Association for a Democratic Kyoto Government, endorsed by JCP.

Results

References 

2014 elections in Japan
Kyoto gubernational elections
Politics of Kyoto Prefecture
April 2014 events in Japan